Senden Bana Kalan (English: What's Left of You) is a Turkish movie released on 17 April 2015.

Synopsis
Ozgur (Ekin Koç) a young boy who has lost his parents since childhood was heir to his grandfather's wealth but there is one condition that he has to live a while in a village otherwise it will be donated to a charity. Ozgur will go to that village and he meets a girl named Elif (Neslihan Atagül Doğulu).

Cast and characters

References

External links
 

2015 films
2010s Turkish-language films
Turkish drama films
2015 drama films
Films set in Turkey